Ioan Tomeș (also known as János Tomes; 15 June 1941 – 12 November 2020) was a Romanian professional footballer of Hungarian ethnicity. He played as a forward for teams such as CS Oradea, Steaua București, UTA Arad or Crișul Oradea and after retirement worked as a football coach at Înfrățirea Oradea during the 1980s. After 1990, he moved to Hungary, where he worked as a coach, especially for Debreceni VSC.

Honours
Steaua București
Cupa României: 1961–62

References

External links
Ioan Tomeș at labtof.ro

1941 births
2020 deaths
Sportspeople from Oradea
Romanian footballers
Romanian people of Hungarian descent
Association football forwards
Liga I players
Liga II players
CA Oradea players
CSA Steaua București footballers
FC UTA Arad players
FC Bihor Oradea players

Romanian sportspeople of Hungarian descent